Senomaty is a market town in Rakovník District in the Central Bohemian Region of the Czech Republic. It has about 1,300 inhabitants.

Administrative parts
Villages of Hostokryje and Nouzov are administrative parts of Senomaty.

Geography
It lies in the Rakovník Uplands. The Rakovnický Stream flows through the market town.

History
The first written mention of Senomaty is in a donation deed of King Wenceslaus I of Bohemia from 1233. During the rule of King John of Bohemia, in 1315, Senomaty was promoted to a market town.

In 1589, Emperor Rudolf II sold Senomaty to Václav Hochhauzer of Pšovce. During his rule the inhabitants were oppressed. In 1592, the market town was destroyed by fire and many residents preferred to move away. The Hochhauzer family owned Senomaty until 1613, when they sold it to the town of Rakovník. With a short break in 1624, Senomaty was property of Rakovník until the establishment of an independent municipality in 1850 and shared its owners and history.

Sights
The landmark of Senomaty is the Church of Saint Lawrence. The church has a late Romanesque nave, which was expanded in the Gothic style in the 14th century. Later it was modified in the Baroque style. Next to the church is a separate half-timbered Renaissance belfry.

The Church of Saint Stephan is a small cemetery church on the edge of the market town. It was built in the Baroque style in the 18th century.

Notable people
Celda Klouček (1855–1935), sculptor and designer
Karel Burian (1870–1924), operatic tenor; lived and died here

References

External links

Market towns in the Czech Republic